This article collates results of opinion polls that were conducted in relation to voting intentions of the Australian public in the lead-up to the 2013 Australian federal election.

Polling firms
Galaxy Research, Newspoll, and Nielsen Australia conduct telephone polls of federal voting intentions. Essential Research reports a rolling average of its two most recent polls, which are conducted each weekend using online surveys.

Through late February 2013, Roy Morgan Research released separate polls conducted by face-to-face interviews and telephone polling. Face-to-face polling was conducted each weekend, though the data published was usually an average of two weeks' polling. Telephone polls were conducted sporadically. Since the end of February 2013, Morgan has released a "multi-mode" poll, consisting of face-to-face, online, and SMS polling.

All of the firms report two-party-preferred vote estimates calculated according to the flow of preferences at the last election. Roy Morgan additionally reports two-party preferred estimates calculated according to respondents' reported preferences (which is usually reported as the head line number in Roy Morgan publications). To ensure comparability between the results reported by different firms, the tables and charts below report only two-party-preferred vote estimates calculated according to the first method.

The polls reported here typically have sample sizes in excess of 1,000, with margins of error of approximately three per cent.

Voter intentions
Since the 2010 election, voters have been regularly polled as to which party they would vote for were an election held on the day of the survey: Labor (ALP), the Coalition, the Greens, or some other candidate. Each firm reports its calculation of the two-party preferred vote (TPP) based on the flow of preferences at the previous election.

Sources for Galaxy, Essential, and Nielsen are provided for each poll; Newspoll and Morgan maintain databases of their polling.

Graphical summary

Data table

Better Prime Minister and approval
Since the 2010 election, Newspoll and Nielsen have regularly polled voters as to whom they believe would be the best prime minister and on their satisfaction with the performance of the prime minister, Kevin Rudd (and previously Julia Gillard), and of the leader of the opposition, Tony Abbott.

Sources for Nielsen are provided for each poll; Newspoll maintains a database of its polling.

References

Essential Research polling

2013
2013 elections in Australia
Australia